"I Think of You" is a song with music by Francis Lai and lyrics by Rod McKuen, published in 1970, and included on McKuen's 1971 album "Pastorale"

Perry Como recording
The song was a hit for Perry Como in 1971, and was the title track of his 1971 album I Think of You. This recording went into the Top 5 of the US Easy Listening chart and Top 20 on the UK chart.

Chart performance

References

Songs with music by Francis Lai
Songs written by Rod McKuen
1970 songs
Perry Como songs